Blomfield Street is a road in the City of London, close to Liverpool Street railway station. It was known as Broker Row, until 1860.

The street was built along the course of a part of the River Walbrook known as the Deepditch. Although the Walbrook is now culverted and runs beneath the street, the land on each side observably dips towards the course of the river.

Setting
The street extends in a SSW-NNE direction from its junction with the road London Wall in the south to Broad Street Place in the north. 

The street forms the boundary between the Bishopsgate Without (to the east) and Coleman Street Ward (to the west) areas of the City of London.

The side streets are Liverpool Street and New Broad Street on the eastern side, and Finsbury Circus to the west. The western side of the street is in the Finsbury Circus Conservation area and includes a number of listed buildings.

History

Walbrook
The street covers a section of the River Walbrook once know as the Deepditch. The river passed under the City's defensive wall (demolished in the 1760s) at a point immediately north of Blomfield Street's junction with the street London Wall, which runs parallel and just inside the course of the former wall which gave it its name. 

Until the early 19th century the river - and subsequent street - was on the edge of the London built-up area; with the developed East End neighbourhood of Bishopsgate Without on the east side, and the open Moorfields area on the west side of the river and subsequent street. The open Moorfields area was historically part of the Manor of Finsbury, before becoming part of the City of London’s Coleman Street Ward, and subsequently being developed around 1817, as Finsbury Circus.

The Deepditch was a canalised section of the Walbrook. When freshly dug, the ditch  was steeply cut with flat base and measured approximately 10m wide by 1.7m deep, at its greatest extent. The London Wall partially dammed the river, leading to marshy conditions on Moorfields. As only part of the flow could pass through the duct under the Wall, the excess water help flood the Moor Ditch, the section of the City Ditch (the defensive ditch on the outer side of the London Wall) between the originally Roman Bishopsgate and the area where the much newer Moorgate would be built, around 1415..

The Deepditch may have been first canalised when the City Ditch was cut, around 1212. This initial work, and a recut around 1415, appears to have had a twofold purpose, to improve the City’s defences and also to help drain Moorfields. 

This section of the Walbrook was the main focus of the Walbrook Skulls phenomena where very large numbers of skulls were found in the bed of the river over many centuries.

The street covers the river
In 1568, William Stow described the Deepditch as being partially filled with all kinds of refuse; "unsavoury things" which restricted the ditch to a narrow channel, and which was in danger of "impoysoning the whole Cittie". Maps in the late 17th century (Faithorne and Newcourt 1658, William Morgan 1682) show Broker Row in place instead of the river.

The street was called Broker Row until 1860, but was renamed in honour of the Bishop of London, Charles Blomfield, who had been rector of St Botolph-without-Bishopsgate (the parish church of Bishopsgate Without), earlier in his career.

Medicine
The original Bethlem (or Bedlam) Hospital was sited on the east side of the river from 1243 to 1676, when it moved to a larger site in Moorfields. the new building extended for 150 metres along the north side of the London Wall. The hospital subsequently moved to Southwark around 1815, when the site, together with the rest of the Lower Moorfields was developed and replaced with the new Finsbury Circus development.

In the early and mid 19th century, before Harley Street rose to prominence, Finsbury (to the west of the street), was London's foremost medical district. Blomfield Street (then Broker Row) had the second Bethlem Hospital (until 1815), while the second site of the  Moorfields Eye Hospital occupied a part of the Finsbury Circus development from 1822 to 1899.

World War One
On the night of 8/9th September 1915, during World War One, German Navy airship L13 (LZ45) carried out what would be the most destructive raids of the war. Twenty-two people were killed, including three at Blomfield Street. A number 35A bus at the junction of Blomfield and Liverpool Streets suffered a direct hit, kiling the conductor and two passengers. The driver was seen wandering the street in shock, staring at his hand which had several fingers missing.

The airship, which was 163 metres long and flying at 2500 metres of altitude, was largely invulnerable to defensive measures at this stage of the war. An eyewitness described catching sight of the airship:

References

Streets in the City of London